Boyz in the Sink was a fictional band of VeggieTales characters who first appeared in the 2003 Silly Songs with Larry segment of The Ballad of Little Joe. The band subsequently appeared in 2007's Moe and the Big Exit  and 2012's If I Sang A Silly Song and Robin Good and The Not-So-Merry Men.

Like other recurring themes, such as The Pirates Who Don't Do Anything, the group was made up of familiar VeggieTales characters performing specific roles. The members of the band were Larry the Cucumber, Mr. Lunt, Junior Asparagus and Jimmy Gourd. The band is named after Boyz n the Hood and its overall concept is a parody of 2000's era "boy-bands", specifically NSYNC and the Backstreet Boys.

Songs

"Belly Button"
"Belly Button", their first song, is Lunt's musical lament that he lacks a navel depicted through his visit to a medical clinic. Tim Hodge voices Khalil the Caterpillar, who appears dressed as a physician and informs Lunt that his stem serves the purpose as a belly button. While originally included as the Silly Song for The Ballad of Little Joe, the video was released separately and won the Children's Jury Award for Animated Short Film or Video at the 2004 Chicago International Children's Film Festival. The song has been cited as the favorite silly song of VeggieTales co-creator and voice of Larry Mike Nawrocki and Milwaukee Bucks center Jake Voskuhl.

"A Mess Down in Egypt"
For the Silly Song in the VeggieTales episode Moe and the Big Exit, the group interrupts the Silly Song announcer in order to tell the Moses story their own way, with a rap entitled "A Mess Down in Egypt". The rap itself is a parody loosely based on The Fresh Prince of Bel Air theme song. The movie website, Rotten Tomatoes, called the silly song a "charmingly goofy musical number".

"Bubble Rap"
The song appears on the Silly Song compilation video, If I Sang A Silly Song and later seen in the episode, Robin Good and His Not-So-Merry Men, as the band, again joined by Khalil, sings of the wonders of the packing material known as bubble wrap.

Other songs
 "You Put This Love In My Heart" appears on the album VeggieTales Worship Songs and was covered by Boyz In The Sink.
 "Jesus Is Just Alright" appears on the album Bob and Larry Sing the 70's and was covered by Boyz In The Sink.
 "Christmas Sizzle Boy" appears on the album The Incredible Singing Christmas Tree.
 "Easter Bunny Hop" appears on the album A Very Veggie Easter.

Album

The band's only album series, Boyz in the Sink, was released by EMI and Big Idea Productions on October 3, 2006. It peaked in 2007 at #10 on the Billboard Top Kid Audio chart and features many covers of songs from VeggieTales.

Track listing
 Boyz in the Sink - 2:35
 Bigger Than The Boogie Man (Where's God When I'm S-Scared?) - 3:43
 The B-O-Y-Z Dance (featuring Kirk Franklin as himself) - 2:43
 Belly Button 2006 (The Ballad of Little Joe; featuring Kirk Franklin as himself) - 3:30
 The Hairbrush Song (Are You My Neighbor?) - 2:31
 Do the Moo Shoo (The Ultimate Silly Song Countdown) - 1:00
 My Day (Junior's Bedtime Songs) - 4:03
 The Funky Polka - 3:13
 Cheeseburger (Madame Blueberry) - 3:10
 Oh No! What We Gonna Do? (Where's God When I'm S-Scared?) - 2:08
 I Can Be Your Friend (Are You My Neighbor?) - 3:21

Other media
Big Idea released a jigsaw puzzle featuring Boyz in the Sink. Boyz in the Sink also appear on the 2006 Big Idea release VeggieTales Worship Songs. The band was featured as part of 2005's "VeggieTales Rockin' Tour LIVE", the second traveling stage show featuring VeggieTales music and characters.

External links
 Bellybutton at IMDb
 [ Boyz in the Sink] at Allmusic

References

VeggieTales
Fictional musical groups
Fictional food characters